The 53rd Regiment Illinois Volunteer Infantry was an infantry regiment from Illinois that served in the Union Army during the American Civil War. The regiment fought at Shiloh,  Hatchie's Bridge, Vicksburg, the March to the Sea, the Carolinas campaign, and Bentonville. After the war ended, it participated in the Grand Review of the Armies before being mustered out of service.

Service
The 53rd Illinois Infantry was organized at Ottawa, Illinois and mustered into Federal service in January 1862.

The regiment was mustered out on July 22, 1865.

Total strength and casualties
The regiment suffered 8 officers and 80 enlisted men who were killed in action or mortally wounded and 2 officers and 137 enlisted men who died of disease, for a total of 227 fatalities.

Commanders
Colonel William H.W. Cushman - resigned on September 3, 1862.
Colonel Daniel F. Hitt  - resigned on January 2, 1863.
Colonel Seth C. Earl - killed in action on July 12, 1863.
Colonel John W. McClanahan - mustered out with the regiment.

See also
List of Illinois Civil War Units
Illinois in the American Civil War

Notes

References
The Civil War Archive

Units and formations of the Union Army from Illinois
1862 establishments in Illinois
Military units and formations established in 1862
Military units and formations disestablished in 1865